Erminia is a feminine given name.
It is related to the name Armina, the feminine form of Herman or Armand, which means soldier (derived from German, literally "army man").

Erminia was a character in Tasso's medieval epic poem Jerusalem Delivered. It is sometimes given as Hermine or Herminie.

People with the given name Erminia
Erminia Caudana (1896–1974), Italian restorer
Erminia Frezzolini (1818—1884), Italian opera singer
Erminia Giuliano (born 1955), member of the Giuliano clan of the Camorra 
Erminia Russo (born 1964), Canadian volleyball player

See also
Erminia (disambiguation)

Feminine given names